Wreck of the Day is the debut studio album by American singer-songwriter Anna Nalick. It was released on April 19, 2005 by Columbia Records. The album was produced by Blind Melon member Brad Smith and former member Christopher Thorn at their own Studio Wishbone.

In 2006, an expanded edition of Wreck of the Day was released to stores. This expanded version included a rearranged version of the title track, three added demo songs, and new cover art.

Critical reception

Upon release, Wreck of the Day was met with positive critical acclaim by music critics, earning a 3/5 star rating from Rolling Stone.

Chart performance
Wreck of the Day debuted at number 20 on the Billboard 200. The album charted for 27 weeks and was certified Gold by the RIAA on September 9, 2005. The album recharted for two weeks in March 2006 and then again for three weeks in July and August, bringing its chart run to 33 weeks.

Track listing

Personnel
Credits adapted from the liner notes of Wreck of the Day.

Musicians

 Anna Nalick – vocals, acoustic guitar 
 Christopher Thorn – guitar
 Stuart Mathis – guitar
 Lyle Workman – guitar
 Brad Smith - bass, percussion
 Zak Rae – keyboards, piano, organ, harmonium
 Eric Rosse – keyboards, piano, organ, harmonium, string arrangements
 Joey Waronker – drums
 Matt Chamberlain – drums
 Cameron Stone – cello, string arrangements
 Christopher Nalick - percussion

Technical

 Eric Rosse – production
 Christopher Thorn – production
 Brad Smith – production
 Mark Endert – mixing
 Steve Marcussen – audio mastering

Charts

Weekly charts

Year-end charts

Certifications

References 

2005 debut albums
Columbia Records albums
Albums produced by Eric Rosse
Anna Nalick albums